United International University (UIU) is a private university in Dhaka, Bangladesh.

The government of Bangladesh approved the establishment of United International University in 2003. Financial support came from the United Group, a Bangladeshi business conglomerate.

Campus

Containing about 100,000 sq. ft. floor space, the UIU main campus has twelve floors with two basements.

A 25-bigha (8.25 acre) plot of land, located at the "United City" at Satarkul (1.5 km east of Embassy of the United States, Dhaka) has been purchased from Neptune Land Development Ltd. for the construction of a permanent campus.

Academics

School of Science & Engineering (SoSE)

Undergraduate Programs 
 B.Sc. in Electrical & Electronic Engineering (EEE)
 B.Sc. in Computer Science & Engineering (CSE)
 B.Sc. in Civil Engineering (CE)

Postgraduate Programs 

 M.Sc. in Computer Science & Engineering (MSCSE)

School of Business and Economics (SoBE) 
The School of Business and Economics (SoBE) of UIU is accredited by the Accreditation Council for Business Schools and Programs (ACBSP).

Undergraduate Programs 
 Bachelor of Business Administration (BBA)
 BBA in Accounting & Information Systems (BBA in AIS)
 Bachelor of Science in Economics (BSECO)

Postgraduate Programs 

 Master of Business Administration (MBA)
 Executive MBA (EMBA)
 Master of Science in Economics
 Master in International Human Resource Management (MIHRM)

School of Humanities and Social Science (SoHSS)

Undergraduate Programs 
 BSS in Environment and Development Studies
BSS in Media Studies and Journalism

Postgraduate Programs 

 Master in Development Studies (MDS)

Professional Academy 
 Cisco Networking Academy
 VLSI Training Academy
 Power & Energy Training Academy(PETA)

Facilities

Electrical & Electronics Laboratory
 Electronics
 Electronic Workshop
 Digital Electronics
 Industrial Electronics
 Radio and Television Engineering
 Microwave and Telecommunication
 VLSI (Very Large scale Integration) Lab
 Measurements and Instrumentation
 Control, Microprocessor and Microcontroller Systems
 Electronics Lab
 Electrical Circuit Lab-1
 Electrical Circuit lab-2
 Simulation Lab
 Control lab
 Microwave & Optical Communication Lab
 Telecom Lab
 Machine Lab
 Power System Lab
 Digital & Microprocessor Lab
 Project Lab

Computer Laboratory
 Software Engineering Laboratory
 Network Laboratory
 Multimedia Laboratory
 Hardware Laboratory

Library and Documentation Center
UIU Central library has a collection of 40,293 items of information materials. Among the materials, 86,200 and 12,458 are books and bound periodicals respectively. Besides, 141 titles are in the current subscription list of journals. Every year, 500 volumes are added to the main reading room of the central library.

Research Center
 Center for Energy Research (CER)
 Biomedical Engineering Center
 Center for Emerging Networks and Technologies Research (CENTeR)
 Brain-Computer Interface(BCI) Research Lab

Events
 International Career Summit
 Photography Festival
 BANMUN
 Tech Quest '18
 Tech Quest '16

List of Vice-Chancellors 
 Prof. Md. Abul Kashem Mia (In-Charge)

Accreditation
The academic programs of the university are recognized by the following organizations:
 UGC (University Grants Commission, Bangladesh)
 Institution of Engineers, Bangladesh (IEB)
 Chartered Institute of Management Accountants (CIMA)
 Accreditation Council For Business Schools And Programs (ACBSP)

Scholarship

References

External links
 
 

2003 establishments in Bangladesh
Universities and colleges in Dhaka
Educational institutions established in 2003
Private universities in Bangladesh